Hoogerwerf is a surname of Dutch origin; it may refer to:

 Andries Hoogerwerf (1906-1977), Dutch athlete and zoologist
 Hoogerwerf's rat (Rattus hoogerwerfi)
 Hoogerwerf's pheasant (Lophura hoogerwerfi), also known as Aceh pheasant
 Andries Hoogerwerf (political scientist) (born 1931), Dutch political scientist and public administration scholar
 Dylan Hoogerwerf (born 1995), Dutch short track speed skater
 Jason Hoogerwerf (born 1966), Australian rugby league footballer

Dutch-language surnames